The year 1999 in Australian television involved many events.

Events
11 January – The ABC moves its long running children's series Play School from its long standing time-slot of 4pm weekdays, to 3:30pm.
1 February – QSTV becomes an affiliate of the Seven Network, becoming known as Seven Central.
13 February – A new Australian science fiction drama series for children Crash Zone produced by the Australian Children's Television Foundation in association with the Disney Channel begins its air on Seven Network.
19 February - Neighbours airs the famous Full Monty strip scene involving Karl Kennedy, Joel Samuels, Drew Kirk, Toadie Rebecchi and Billy Kennedy.
March – WIN Television WA commences broadcasting to regional & remote Western Australia, ending the long-time monopoly held by Golden West Network.
April – Who Wants to Be a Millionaire? begins on Channel Nine and Adriana Xenides retires from Seven's Wheel of Fortune after 18 years as letter turner. She will be replaced by former model Sophie Falkiner. Xenides died from bowel cancer in 2010.
7 April – The famous Toyota Hilux Bugger TV commercial that originally aired in New Zealand goes to air for the first time on Australian television during a commercial break of an episode of The Panel on Network Ten.
9 April – American animated sitcom Family Guy debuts on the Seven Network.
19 April – Final episode of Australian talk show Strassman airs on Nine Network.
21 April - In Neighbours, Hannah Martin returns from France; Philip Martin's birthday
6 May – Musical director Geoff Harvey is sacked from the Nine Network after 38 years.
28 May – Final episode of the Australian National morning program 11AM airs on the Seven Network. The show was axed after 24 years.
May – The Seven Network becomes the first Australian television network to introduce a watermark on its on-air programs.
21 June - In Neighbours, Toadie Rebecchi loses his famous ponytail.
28 June – Australian drama series SeaChange returns to the ABC for a second season achieving recording ratings for the network.
1 July – Australian children's longest running series Mr. Squiggle celebrates its 40th year.
9 July – Australian children's longest running series Mr. Squiggle airs its final episode on the ABC.
13 July - In Neighbours, it was Sarah Beaumont and Peter Hannay's wedding.
19 August – A brand new Australian political satire sketch comedy television series called BackBerner presented by standup comic Peter Berner and noted Australian character actor Louise Siversen screens on the ABC.
31 August – American sitcom The King of Queens starring Kevin James premieres on the Nine Network.
20 September – British children's animated series Bob the Builder debuts on the ABC.
17 October – British six-part documentary series Walking with Dinosaurs debuts on the ABC.
20 October - In Neighbours, Philip and Hannah Martin and Ruth Wilkinson leave; Joe, Lyn, Steph, Flick and Michelle Scully arrive.
24 October – American crime drama series The Sopranos begins on the Nine Network.
19 November – Studio 9 Unplugged, a tribute special dedicated the famous studio rooms at GTV9 presented by Don Lane, goes to air on the Nine Network, ending a 40-year era of live television in that studio.
20 November – The final episode of Hey Hey It's Saturday airs on Nine Network. Before retiring, the creator, host and producer of the series Daryl Somers leaves Nine Network after 28 years.
23 November – The 1996 slasher film Scream starring David Arquette, Neve Campbell and Courteney Cox premieres on the Nine Network at 9:30pm.
26 November – British cooking programme The Naked Chef starring Jamie Oliver screens on the ABC. In Neighbours, the 1999 season final features the Millennium party plus the Scully house burns!
2 December – American animated science fiction sitcom Futurama created by Matt Groening the creator of The Simpsons debuts on the Seven Network.
13 December – Australian children's educational TV series Lift Off airs on ABC for the very last time at 10:00am.
31 December – ABC is the host Australian broadcaster of the international TV event 2000 Today, a 26-hour live telecast of new year celebrations around the world, commencing at 8:30pm (AEDST) on 31 December.
Jana Wendt becomes presenter of the Australian television public affairs program Dateline.

Channels

New channels
 4 April – Australian Christian Channel
 1 October – Oh!

Debuts

Free-to-air

Domestic

International

Film debuts

Changes to network affiliation
This is a list of programs which made their premiere on an Australian television network that had previously premiered on another Australian television network. The networks involved in the switch of allegiances are predominantly both free-to-air networks or both subscription television networks. Programs that have their free-to-air/subscription television premiere, after previously premiering on the opposite platform (free-to air to subscription/subscription to free-to air) are not included. In some cases, programs may still air on the original television network. This occurs predominantly with programs shared between subscription television networks.

Domestic

International

Subscription Television

International

Changes to network affiliation
This is a list of programs which made their premiere on an Australian television network that had previously premiered on another Australian television network. The networks involved in the switch of allegiances are predominantly both free-to-air networks or both subscription television networks. Programs that have their free-to-air/subscription television premiere, after previously premiering on the opposite platform (free-to air to subscription/subscription to free-to air) are not included. In some cases, programs may still air on the original television network. This occurs predominantly with programs shared between subscription television networks.

Domestic

International

Subscription premieres
This is a list of programs which made their premiere on Australian subscription television that had previously premiered on Australian free-to-air television. Programs may still air on the original free-to-air television network.

Domestic

International

Specials

Television shows

ABC
 Mr. Squiggle and Friends (1959–1999)
 Four Corners (1961–present)

Seven Network
 Wheel of Fortune (1981–1996, 1996–2003, 2004–present)
 Home and Away (1988–2005, 2005–present)
 Blue Heelers (1994–2006)
 The Great Outdoors (1993–present)
 Today Tonight (1995–present)
 All Saints (1998–present)

Nine Network
 Today (1982–present)
 Sale of the Century (1980–2001)
 A Current Affair (1971–1978, 1988–2005, 2006–present)
 Australia's Funniest Home Video Show (1990–2000, 2000–2004, 2005–present)
 The AFL Footy Show (1994–present)
 The NRL Footy Show (1994–present)
 Water Rats (1996–2001)
 Burgo's Catch Phrase (1997–2001, 2002–2004)

Network Ten
 Neighbours (1985–1989, 1989–present)
 GMA With Bert Newton (1991–2005)

Ending / Resting this year

See also
 1999 in Australia
 List of Australian films of 1999

References

References